Dizy may refer to:

Dizy, Switzerland, a municipality in the canton of Vaud
in France
Dizy, Marne
Dizy-le-Gros in the Aisne department

See also
 Dizzy (disambiguation)
 Dizi (disambiguation)